Michael David Bishop, Baron Glendonbrook   (born 10 February 1942) is a British-Australian businessman and life peer who rose to prominence as owner of the airline BMI. He sold his stake in the airline to Lufthansa on 1 July 2009 and  had an estimated personal fortune of £280 million. He was one of the country's first openly gay senior executives.

Early life
Michael Bishop was born in Bowdon, Cheshire. The son of a factory boss, aged six he was given a pleasure flight, and in 1949 his parents took him on an Aer Lingus flight to Dublin in search of chocolate, a rarity in the post-war rationing in Manchester.

Educated at the independent Mill Hill School in north London, he enjoyed flying and as a result took a series of school holiday jobs with an aerial photographer.

British Midland
In 1963, Bishop joined the ground handling operation of Manchester-based Mercury Airlines, a schedule and charter airline, which was taken over by British Midland Airways (later re-branded as BMI) in October 1964. Bishop joined British Midland, and rose to become General Manager of the airline in 1969 and Managing Director in 1972.

In 1978, the London-based Minster Assets investment group, which owned British Midland, decided to sell its stake. With the help of an entrepreneurial Californian dentist, Bishop raised £2.5 million to lead the management buy-out, and was subsequently appointed chairman: "I had to borrow the money from an American citizen. Most venture capitalists want a return of 40% to make up for all their other failures, and they want an exit strategy." From 1969 he was the key driving force behind the steady growth of the airline, which held eleven percent of the landing and take-off slots at London Heathrow Airport, second only to British Airways, and had a route network spanning Europe, North America, Asia and Africa.

Bishop formerly held a controlling 50% + 1 share stake of BMI, with German airline Lufthansa holding 30% minus 1 share, and SAS Airlines a further 20%. In October 2008, under a deal agreed in 1999 as part of the package for BMI to join the Star Alliance, Bishop agreed to sell his 50% stake to Lufthansa for an undisclosed sum, though reports suggested it was about £318m. BDLH (LH's holding vehicle) acquired Bishop's share on 1 July 2009, assuming full control of the company.

Honours and appointments
Between 1991 and 1993, Bishop was deputy chairman of Channel 4 television, becoming chairman from 1993 to 1997. He was also a board member at Sir Nigel Rudd's Williams plc., and deputy chairman at Airtours.

In 1986, he was appointed CBE, and in 1991 he was knighted. He was awarded the Honorary Degree of Doctor of Laws (LL.D) from the University of Leicester on 12 July 2007.

In an annual survey by The Independent of the UK's most influential gay men and women, Bishop was ranked as number 5 in 2005 and number 6 in 2006.

In February 2011, Bishop was created a life peer as Baron Glendonbrook, of Bowdon in the County of Cheshire, and was introduced in the House of Lords the next month, where he sits as a Conservative.

Bishop was appointed Member of the Order of Australia (AM) in the 2023 Australia Day Honours for "significant service to the not-for-profit sector through philanthropic support".

Arms

Personal life
Bishop is openly gay and, since 2008, has spoken out publicly about gay rights and success in the workplace. He is often referred to as "dapper" by the press, to note his keen sense of elegance.

A member of the Conservative Party since the age of 17, he is chairman of the Board of Trustees of the D'Oyly Carte Opera Company—which promotes and sometimes, in recent years, has returned to producing the operas of Gilbert and Sullivan—due to his personal financial sponsorship. Bishop lives in London and at Bruern Abbey, West Oxfordshire, having purchased the 18th-century property in 2013. The Abbey has been completely refurbished under his ownership, including the installation of 'a large and impressive cantilever stone staircase and twenty-five kilometres of data cabling' as well as a 'large underground car park'.

Bishop is a member of the Lord Lyon Society.

References
 British Independent Airlines since 1946, Merseyside Aviation Society, Liverpool, 1976, 

1942 births
Living people
People educated at Mill Hill School
English businesspeople
Businesspeople awarded knighthoods
Businesspeople in aviation
British LGBT businesspeople
People associated with Gilbert and Sullivan
Commanders of the Order of the British Empire
Members of the Order of Australia
Knights Bachelor
British Midland International
Conservative Party (UK) life peers
English LGBT politicians
Gay politicians
LGBT life peers
Chairmen of Channel 4
Life peers created by Elizabeth II